Alfred Newton published A list of the birds of Europe, a translation of the Aves section of  by Johann Heinrich Blasius.
South Australian Institute Museum opens with Frederick George Waterhouse as Curator.
Graceanna Lewis begins ornithological study at the Philadelphia Academy of Natural Sciences.
Ferdinand Stoliczka joins the Geological Survey of India becoming interested in birds two years later.
Birds described in 1862 include American herring gull, slaty-backed forest falcon, Principe seedeater, yellow-throated spadebill, Réunion harrier, Wallace's fairywren, 
Hermann Schlegel begins a vast work of 14 volumes Muséum d'histoire naturelle des Pays-Bas. 
Ongoing events
John Gould The birds of Australia; Supplement 1851–69. 1 vol. 81 plates; Artists: J. Gould and H. C. Richter; Lithographer: H. C. Richter
John Gould The birds of Asia; 1850-83 7 vols. 530 plates, Artists: J. Gould, H. C. Richter, W. Hart and J. Wolf; Lithographers:H. C. Richter and W. Hart
The Ibis

References

Bird
Birding and ornithology by year